Touch is one of the sensations processed by the somatosensory system.

Touch may also refer to:

Places 
 Touch (river), in France
 Touch House, a mansion near Stirling, Scotland

Computing and technology 
 touch (command), a computer program
 HTC Touch, a touchscreen phone
 iPod Touch, a portable media player, PDA, and Wi-Fi platform
 Multi-touch, capability of a flat screen to detect touch gestures.
 Ubuntu Touch, an interface

Arts, entertainment, and media

Comics and manga 
 Touch (manga), a 1985 manga and anime series by Mitsuru Adachi
 Touch, a 6-issue comic book series published under the DC Focus imprint

Film 
 Touch (1997 film), by Paul Schrader
 Touch (2005 film), by director Isshin Inudō
 The Touch (1971 film), by Ingmar Bergman
 The Touch (2002 film), by Peter Pau

Television 

Touch (American TV series), a 2012–2013 American thriller television series
 Touch (South Korean TV series), a 2020 South Korean television series

Literature 
 Touch, a 1987 book by Elmore Leonard
 Touch, a 2014 book by Natalia Jaster
 Touch, a 2022 book by Olaf Olafsson

Music

Groups
 Touch (1960s band), an American rock band
 Touch (1980s band), a 1980s American rock band
 Touch (girl group), the original name of Spice Girls
 Touch (South Korean group), Korean boy band

Albums 
 Touch (Amerie album), or the title song
 Touch (Brian Howe album), by Brian Howe
 Touch (Con Funk Shun album), 1980
 Touch (Delirious? album), or the title song
 Touch (Eurythmics album), 1983
 Touch (July Talk album), 2016
 Touch (Laura Branigan album), or the title song
 Touch (NEWS album), 2005
 Touch (Noiseworks album), or the title song
 Touch (Sarah McLachlan album), or the title song
 Touch (The Supremes album), or the title song
 Touch, by Touch (1960s band)
 Touch (EP), or the title song, by Miss A
 Touch, by Dave Grohl, a soundtrack album from Paul Schrader's film Touch

Songs 
"Touch" (Amerie song), 2005
 "Touch", a song by Daft Punk from the 2013 album Random Access Memories
"Touch: (Earth, Wind & Fire song), 1984
"Touch" (Little Mix song), 2016
"Touch" (Natasha Bedingfield song), 2010
"Touch" (Noiseworks song), 1988
"Touch" (NCT 127 song), 2018
"Touch" (Omarion song), 2004
"Touch", 1966 song by the band The Outsiders
"Touch" (Pia Mia song), 2015
"Touch" (Shift K3Y song), 2014
"Touch" (Sori song), 2018
"Touch" (The Supremes song), 1971
"Touch" (Tea Party song), 2000
"Touch / Yume no Tsuzuki", 2005 song by Younha

Other arts, entertainment, and media
 Touch (ballet), a ballet by David Parsons
 Touch FM
 Touch Music, an audio-visual publishing company based in the UK
 Touch! Generations, a video-game brand

Sports 
 Touch football (disambiguation)
 Touch (rugby), an area of a rugby field
 Touch (sport), a sport derived from rugby football

Other uses 
 Consoling touch, a social behaviour
 Touch, a characteristic of a tangent, in geometry
 Touch, a clothing line by Alyssa Milano
 Touch typing, typing without using the sense of sight to find the keys
 Russian Bank, a card game

See also
 
 Contact (disambiguation)
 Haptics (disambiguation)
 Human touch (disambiguation)
 Tactile (disambiguation)
 The Touch (disambiguation)
 Touched (disambiguation)